The Ashizawa Formation is a Coniacian geologic formation in northeastern Honshu, Japan. Dinosaur remains are among the fossils that have been recovered from the formation, although none have yet been referred to a specific genus. A jawbone belonging to a therian mammal has also been discovered from this unit.

Palaeofauna
Dinosauria indet.
Squalus sp.
Theria indet.
Theropoda indet. ("Futabasaurus") - "tibia"

See also

 List of dinosaur-bearing rock formations
 List of stratigraphic units with indeterminate dinosaur fossils

Footnotes

References
 Weishampel, David B.; Dodson, Peter; and Osmólska, Halszka (eds.): The Dinosauria, 2nd, Berkeley: University of California Press. 861 pp. .

Geologic formations of Japan
Coniacian Stage
Upper Cretaceous Series of Asia